Soloneshensky District is an administrative and municipal district (raion), one of the fifty-nine in Altai Krai, Russia. It is located in the southeast of the krai. Its administrative center is the rural locality (a selo) of Soloneshnoye. Population:  The population of Soloneshnoye accounts for 41.4% of the district's total population.

See also
 Okladnikov Cave
 Denisova Cave

References

Notes

Sources

Districts of Altai Krai